John Gale (1516/17 – 1554), of Crediton, Devon, was an English politician who served as MP for Totnes in 1545 and for Tavistock in 1547.  Gale died in 1554 leaving his entire estate to his wife, Elizabeth.

References

1517 births
1554 deaths
People from Crediton
Members of the Parliament of England (pre-1707) for Totnes
English MPs 1545–1547
English MPs 1547–1552
Members of the Parliament of England for Tavistock